The 2011 Armenian First League season began on 5 April 2011, and ended on 10 October 2011. At the end of 28 rounds, Shengavit were crowned champions; however, they were not eligible for promotion since they were the reserve team of Ulisses, which already participated in the Armenian Premier League.

League table

See also
 2011 Armenian Premier League
 2011 Armenian Cup

References

 

Armenian First League seasons
2
Armenia
Armenia